Ian Grote Stirling  (born September 26, 1941) is a research scientist emeritus with Environment and Climate Change Canada and an adjunct professor in the University of Alberta Department of Biological Sciences. His research has focused mostly on Arctic and Antarctic zoology and ecology, and he is one of the world's top authorities on polar bears. Stirling has written five books and more than 150 articles published in peer-reviewed scientific journals. He has written and spoken extensively about the danger posed to polar bears by global warming.

Early life and education
Ian Stirling was born to Andrew and Margaret Stirling on September 26, 1941. He completed his B.Sc. at the University of British Columbia (UBC) in 1963, and his M.Sc. in zoology at UBC in 1965. For his M.Sc. thesis, Stirling studied captive blue grouse under James F. Bendell. Stirling obtained his Ph.D. in 1968.

Career
From 1970 to 2007, Stirling served as a research scientist for the Canadian Wildlife Service, focusing his research on polar bears, most notably on a long-term study of polar bears in western Hudson Bay near Churchill, Manitoba. He was among the first to draw attention to the potential impacts of climate change on polar bears. Stirling retired in 2007.

Stirling has served as a member of the Committee of Scientific Advisors of the Marine Mammal Commission, and he was the first Canadian to be elected president of the Society for Marine Mammalogy. He is a long-standing member of the IUCN Polar Bear Specialist Group and currently acts as a scientific advisor to Polar Bears International.

Awards and recognition
 Officer of the Order of Canada (2000)
 Northern Science Award, Indian and Northern Affairs Canada (2002)
 Fellow of the Royal Society of Canada (2007)
 D.Sc., University of British Columbia (2013)
 Kenneth S. Norris Lifetime Achievement Award (2013)
 Weston Family Prize for Lifetime Achievement in Northern Research (2015)

Selected publications
Stirling I (1997) The importance of polynyas, ice edges, and leads to marine mammals and birds. Journal of Marine Systems 10, 9–21.
Stirling I, Lunn NJ, Iacozza J (1999) Long-term trends in the population ecology of polar bears in western Hudson Bay in relation to climatic change. Arctic 52, 294–306.
Stirling I, Parkinson CL (2006) Possible effects of climate warming on selected populations of polar bears (Ursus maritimus) in the Canadian Arctic. Arctic 59, 261–275.
Stirling, I (2011) Polar Bears: The Natural History of a Threatened Species. Fitzhenry and Whiteside. Markham, ON. 334 pp.
Stirling I, Derocher AE (2012) Effects of climate warming on polar bears: a review of the evidence. Global Change Biology 18, 2694–2706.

References

External links
 University of Alberta bio
 Environment Canada bio
 Polar Bears International bio

1941 births
Living people
Canadian ecologists
Fellows of the Royal Society of Canada
Officers of the Order of Canada
Scientists from Edmonton
Academic staff of the University of Alberta
University of British Columbia alumni
University of Canterbury alumni
Canadian mammalogists
20th-century Canadian scientists
21st-century Canadian scientists
Place of birth missing (living people)
Canadian civil servants